The ML-57 is a submachine gun manufactured by the Buenos Aires-based Halcon corporation.

Overview
The weapon is chambered in 9mm Parabellum for the Argentine Army and in .45 ACP for Police Forces, fed from 30-round magazines.

Variants

ML-60
A later variant of the ML-57 was the ML-60 which housed a two trigger group which enabled select fire capabilities.

See also
Weapons of the Salvadoran Civil War

References
 Walter Harold Black Smith, Joseph Edward Smith (1973). Small arms of the world: a basic manual of small arms. Stackpole Books. p. 196-197.

External links
 Edoardo Mori - Historical Atlas of guns.
Jonas de Carvalho - Photos - Museo de armas de la Nación (Buenos Aires), 2011. Flickr.com.
 Jonas de Carvalho - Museo de armas de la Nación (Buenos Aires), 2011  Halcon ML-57. Flickr.com.

9mm Parabellum submachine guns
.45 ACP submachine guns
Submachine guns of Argentina
Fábrica de Armas Halcón firearms